Depressaria erinaceella is a moth of the family Depressariidae. It is found in France, Spain, Portugal, North Macedonia and on the Italian islands of Sardinia and Sicily.

The wingspan is about 25 mm. A new generation is born about once a year.

The larvae feed on Cynara cardunculus. They bore the stem of their host plant.

References

External links
lepiforum.de

Moths described in 1870
Depressaria
Moths of Europe